Lillooet , known in the language itself as  / , is the language of the St’át’imc, a Salishan language of the Interior branch spoken in southern British Columbia, Canada, around the middle Fraser and Lillooet Rivers.  The language of the Lower Lillooet people uses the name , because  means "the language of the people of Sat̓", i.e. the Upper Lillooet of the Fraser River.

Lillooet is an endangered language with as few as 200 native speakers practically all of whom are over 60 years of age (Gordon 2005).

Regional varieties

St̓át̓imcets has two main dialects:

 Upper/Northern St̓át̓imcets ( St̓át̓imcets, Fountain)
 Lower/Southern St̓at̓imcets (a.k.a. Lil̓wat7úlmec, Mount Currie)

Upper St̓át̓imcets is spoken around Fountain, Pavilion, Lillooet, and neighboring areas. Lower St̓át̓imcets is spoken around Mount Currie and neighboring areas. An additional subdialect called Skookumchuck is spoken within the Lower St̓át̓imcets dialect area, but there is no information available in van Eijk (1981, 1997) (which are the main references for this article).  A common usage used by the bands of the Lower Lillooet River below Lillooet Lake is Ucwalmicwts.

The "Clao7alcw" (Raven's Nest) language nest program at Mount Currie, home of the Lil’wat, is conducted in the Lil̓wat language and was the focus of Onowa McIvor's Master's thesis.

As of 2014, "the Coastal Corridor Consortium— an entity made up of board members from First Nations and educational partners to improve aboriginal access to and performance in postsecondary education and training— ... [has] developed a Lil’wat-language program."

Phonology

Consonants

St̓át̓imcets has 44 consonants:

 Obstruents consist of the stops, affricates, and fricatives. There are 22 obstruents.
 Sonorants consist of the nasals and approximants. There are 22 sonorants.
 Glottalized stops are pronounced as ejective consonants. Glottalized sonorants are pronounced with creaky voice:  = .
 The glottalized consonants of St'at'imcets contrast not only with plain consonants, but also with sequences of plain consonant + glottal stop, or glottalized consonant + glottal stop, in either order. This holds for both the obstruents and the sonorants:  ≠  ≠  ≠  ≠  ≠  and  ≠  ≠  ≠  ≠  ≠ .
 The dental approximants  are pronounced alternatively as interdental fricatives  or as dental fricatives , depending on the dialect of St'at'imcets.
 There are four pairs of retracted and nonretracted consonants (which alternate morphophonemically). Retraction on consonants is essentially velarization, although additionally, nonretracted  is phonetically laminal  whereas retracted  is apical . (St'at'imcets has retracted-nonretracted vowel pairs.)
 
 
 
 
 Among the post-velar consonants, the obstruents  are all post-velar (pre-uvular)  whereas the approximants  are either pharyngeal or true uvulars.

Vowels

St'at'imcets has 8 vowels:

 The phonetic realization of the phonemes are indicated in brackets to the right.
 All retracted vowels are indicated by a line under the vowel. These retracted vowels alternate morphophonemically. (Note that St'at'imcets also has retracted consonants.)
Because retracted  and non-retracted  can both pronounced , there is often phonetic overlap.

Phonological processes

 epenthetic .

Post-velar Harmony (retraction):

 Within roots, there is a restriction that all consonant and vowel retracted-nonretracted pairs must be of the same type.  That is, a root may not contain both a retracted and a nonretracted vowel or consonant.  This is a type of Retracted Tongue Root harmony (also called pharyngeal harmony) involving both vowels and consonants that is an areal feature of this region of North America, shared by other Interior Salishan and non-Salishan languages (for example see Chilcotin vowel flattening).
 In addition to the root harmony restriction, some suffixes harmonize with the root to which they are attached. For instance, the inchoative suffix  -wil’c:

{| class="IPA wikitable"
|-
| ama "good"
| /ʔáma/
| + /-ɣʷélʼx/
| →
| 
| amawíl’c  "to get better"
|-
|  "bad"
| 
| + 
| →
| 
| qvḻwíiḻʼc  "to get spoiled"
|}

Orthography

There are two orthographies, one based on Americanist Phonetic Notation that was developed by the Mount Currie School and used by the Lillooet Council, and a modification by Bouchard that is used by the Upper St̓át̓imc Language, Culture and Education Society. The latter orthography is unusual in that  is written .

Grammar
St'at'imcets has two main types of words:

 full words
 variable words
 invariable words
 clitics
 proclitics
 enclitics

The variable word type may be affected by many morphological processes, such as prefixation, suffixation, infixation, reduplication, and glottalization.

St̓át̓imcets, like the other Salishan languages, exhibits predicate/argument flexibility. All full words are able to occur in the predicate (including words with typically 'nouny' meanings such as nk̓yap 'coyote', which in the predicate essentially means 'to be a coyote') and any full word is able to appear in an argument, even those that seem "verby", such as t̓ak 'go along', which as a noun, is equivalent the noun phrase 'one that goes along'.

Reduplication

St̓át̓imcets, as is typical of the Salishan family, has several types of  reduplication (and triplication) that have a range of functions such as expressing plural, diminutive, aspect, etc.

A more complicated type of reduplication is the internal reduplication used to express the diminutive. In this case the consonant before a stressed vowel is reduplicated after the stressed vowel and usually the vowel then changes to e. Examples are below:

More than one reduplicative process can occur in a given word:

St’át’imcets has several other variants of the above types. Reduplication is further complicated by consonant glottalization (see van Eijk (1997) for details).

Mood and modality
The subjunctive mood appears in nine distinct environments, with a range of semantic effects, including:
 weakening an imperative to a polite request,
 turning a question into an uncertainty statement,
 creating an ignorance free relative.
The St̓át̓imcets subjunctive also differs from Indo-European subjunctives in that it is not selected by attitude verbs.

St̓át̓imcets has a complex system of subject and object agreement. There are different subject agreement paradigms for transitive vs. intransitive predicates. For intransitive predicates, there are three distinct subject paradigms, one of which is glossed as 'subjunctive' by van Eijk (1997) and Davis (2006)

Sample text

The following is a portion of a story in van Eijk (1981:87) told by Rosie Joseph of Mount Currie.

St̓át̓imcets:
Nilh aylh lts7a sMáma ti húz̓a qweqwl̓el̓tmínan. N̓as ku7 ámlec áku7 tsípunsa. Nilh t̓u7 st̓áksas ti xláka7sa. Tsicw áku7, nilh t̓u7 ses wa7, kwánas et7ú i sqáwtsa. Wa7 ku7 t̓u7 áti7 xílem, t̓ak ku7 knáti7 ti pú7y̓acwa. Nilh ku7 t̓u7 skwánas, lip̓in̓ás ku7. Nilh ku7 t̓u7 aylh stsuts: "Wa7 nalh aylh láti7 kapv́ta!" Nilh ku7 t̓u7 aylh sklhaka7mínas ku7 láti7 ti sqáwtsa cwilhá k̓a, nao7q̓ spawts ti kwanensása...
English translation:
This time it is Máma I am going to talk about. She went that way to get some food from her roothouse. So she took along her bucket. She got there, and she stayed around, taking potatoes. She was doing that, and then a mouse ran by there. So she grabbed it, she squeezed it. So she said: "You get all squashed now!" So she opened her hand and she let go of what turned out to be a potato, it was a rotten potato that she had caught....

References

Bibliography
 Frank, Beverley, Rose Whitley, and Jan van Eijk. Nqwaluttenlhkalha English to Statimcets Dictionary. Volume One. 2002. 
 Joseph, Marie. (1979). Cuystwí malh Ucwalmícwts: Ucwalmícwts curriculum for beginners. Mount Currie, B.C.: Ts’zil Publishing House. .
 Larochell, Martina; van Eijk, Jan P.; & Williams, Lorna. (1981). Cuystwí malh Ucwalmícwts: Lillooet legends and stories. Mount Currie, B.C.: Ts’zil Publishing House. .
 Lillooet Tribal Council. (1993). Introducing St'at'imcets (Fraser River Dialect): A primer. Lillooet, British Columbia: Lillooet Tribal Council.
 Matthewson, Lisa, and Beverley Frank. When I was small = I wan kwikws : a grammatical analysis of St'át'imc oral narratives. First nations languages. Vancouver: UBC Press, 2005. 
 Poser, William J. (2003). The status of documentation for British Columbia native languages. Yinka Dene Language Institute Technical Report (No. 2). Vanderhoof, British Columbia: Yinka Dene Language Institute. (2003 updated version).
 van Eijk, Jan P. (1981). Cuystwí malh Ucwalmícwts: Teach yourself Lillooet: Ucwalmícwts curriculum for advanced learners. Mount Currie, B.C.: Ts’zil Publishing House. .
 van Eijk, Jan P. (1985). The Lillooet language: Phonology, morphology, syntax. Amsterdam: Universiteit van Amsterdam.
 van Eijk, Jan P. (1988). Lillooet forms for 'pretending' and 'acting like'. International Journal of Linguistics, 54, 106-110.
 van Eijk, Jan P. (1990). Intransitivity, transitivity and control in Lillooet Salish. In H. Pinkster & I. Grenee (Eds.), Unity in diversity: Papers presented to Simon C. Dik on his 50th birthday (pp. 47–64). Dordrecht, Holland: Foris.
 van Eijk, Jan P. (1993). CVC reduplication and infixation in Lillooet. In A. Mattina & T. Montler (Eds.), American Indian linguistics and ethnography in honor of Laurence C. Thompson (pp. 317–326). University of Montana occasional papers in linguistics (No. 10). Missoula: University of Montana.
 van Eijk, Jan P. (1997). The Lillooet language: Phonology, morphology, syntax. Vancouver: UBC Press. . (Revised version of van Eijk 1985).
 Williams, Lorna; van Eijk, Jan P.; & Turner, Gordon. (1979). Cuystwí malh Ucwalmícwts: Ucwalmícwts curriculum for intermediates. Mount Currie, B.C.: Ts’zil Publishing House. .

External links
 Northern St̓át̓imcets language, at First Voices
 map of Northwest Coast First Nations (including St'at'imc)
 Bibliography of Materials on the Lillooet Language (YDLI)
 The Lillooet Language (YDLI)
 Northern St'at'imcets - The Lillooet Language
 The St’at’imcets Language (Native Language, Font, & Keyboard)
 USLCES webpages (USLCES webpages)
 OLAC resources in and about the Lillooet language

St'at'imc
Interior Salish languages
Indigenous languages of the North American Plateau
First Nations languages in Canada